Ballochia atro-virgata is a species of plant in the family Acanthaceae. It is endemic to Yemen.  Its natural habitats are subtropical or tropical dry forests, subtropical or tropical dry shrubland, and subtropical or tropical dry lowland grassland.

References

Endemic flora of Socotra
atro-virgata
Data deficient plants
Taxonomy articles created by Polbot
Plants described in 1884